The Shorter Mansion is a Classical Revival-style historic house museum in Eufaula, Alabama.  The two-story masonry structure was built in 1884 by Eli Sims Shorter II and his wife, Wileyna Lamar Shorter, but it burned in 1900. The house as seen today was built in 1906 and was designed by architect Curran R. Ellis of Macon, Georgia.  Eli Sims Shorter died in 1908, but his wife resided in the house until 1927, when it was passed to their daughter, Fannie Shorter Upshaw.  It was in turn inherited by Upshaw's daughter, Wileyna S. Kennedy, in 1959.

The Kennedy family moved away from the city and the house was purchased by the Eufaula Heritage Association, initially formed in order to buy and restore the house, at auction for $33,000 in 1965.  The Eufaula Heritage Association organized the city's first pilgrimage in 1966 and became the primary historic preservation organization in Eufaula, a role it continues to fulfill to the present day. The Association offers tours of the Shorter Mansion year round.

The mansion was added to the National Register of Historic Places on January 14, 1972.

See also
National Register of Historic Places listings in Barbour County, Alabama

References

External links

 Eufaula Heritage Association: Shorter Mansion

National Register of Historic Places in Barbour County, Alabama
Houses on the National Register of Historic Places in Alabama
Neoclassical architecture in Alabama
Houses completed in 1906
Historic house museums in Alabama
Museums in Barbour County, Alabama
Houses in Barbour County, Alabama
1906 establishments in Alabama